A love tester machine (also called love meter or love teller) is a type of amusement personality tester machine, which upon receiving credit tries to rate the subject's sex appeal, love abilities or romantic feelings for someone. Many love testers measure the moisture on the skin surface of the subject's hands by electrically testing the skin conductance and rates accordingly. Others measure the temperature of the skin. However, some machines just use a random generator. Love meters could be found in penny arcades, and can be seen in modern video arcades, amusement parks, in bars and restaurants. Such vending machines are for amusement purposes only and do not actually give a real result. Nintendo, before entering the video game industry, released their own handheld love tester.

In media

In "The Simpsons Spin-Off Showcase", an episode of the animated TV series The Simpsons, Moe Szyslak receives dating advice from Abraham Simpson, whose ghost is possessing a love testing machine. The love tester also appears in Moe's Tavern in few other episodes.
In 3rd Rock from the Sun Tommy restores an old love testing machine at the bar where Harry works.
American Restoration features a restoration of an early twentieth century love tester machine in the 49th episode "King of Signs".
In an episode of Bob's Burgers, titled "My Fuzzy Valentine", Bob tries to find the love tester machine that he and Linda supposedly used on one of their dates.

Digital versions
Pinball Hall of Fame: The Gottlieb Collection includes a simulation of a real world love meter. Similar games can also be found on the Internet or as software applications. Software love testers are based on randomness, on various user inputs or on a questionnaire and an algorithm. Only serious surveys and analyses can thereby aim to give a real result.

Gallery
The Musée Mécanique in San Francisco has a collection of over 300 mechanical games including love testers.

See also
Hand boiler, a glass sculpture sometimes used as a collector's item to measure love
Love Tester, a novelty toy made by Nintendo that tries to determine how much two people love each other
Fortune teller machine
Strength tester machine
E-meter

Notes

External links

Exhibit Supply Love Tester coin-operated arcade game

Commercial machines